The 1961–62 Michigan Wolverines men's basketball team represented the University of Michigan in intercollegiate basketball during the 1961–62 season.  The team finished the season in eighth place in the Big Ten Conference with an overall record of 7-17 and 5–9 against conference opponents.

Dave Strack was in his second year as the team's head coach.  Tom Cole was the team's leading scorer with 361 points in 24 games for an average of 15.0 points per game.  Cole also led the team with 223 rebounds.

Statistical leaders

See also
 1962 in Michigan

References

Michigan
Michigan Wolverines men's basketball seasons
Michigan Wolverines basketball
Michigan Wolverines basketball